Hyloxalus abditaurantius is a species of frog in the family Dendrobatidae. It is endemic to Colombia. Its natural habitats are tropical moist montane forests, rivers, and heavily degraded former forest. It is threatened by habitat loss.

References

Abditaurantius
Amphibians of Colombia
Endemic fauna of Colombia
Amphibians described in 1975
Taxonomy articles created by Polbot